John Frederick Martin was an American football player and coach.  He played football for Oberlin College.  He later served as a coach at Wesleyan University.  He was hired as an assistant football coach at Wesleyan in 1920 and became the head football coach in 1922.  In three seasons as the head football coach at Wesleyan, Martin compiled a record of 9–13.  Martin also coached track and field at Wesleyan.

References

1895 births
Year of death missing
Oberlin Yeomen football players
Wesleyan Cardinals football coaches
College track and field coaches in the United States